Bishop Alexander Carter Catholic Secondary School is a Roman Catholic high school in Greater Sudbury, Ontario, Canada, located on Francis Street in the community of Hanmer.

The school was established by the Sudbury Catholic District School Board in 2002 as the city's third coeducational Catholic high school. It primarily serves students from the Valley East and Rayside-Balfour areas of Sudbury. The school was named in honour of Alexander Carter, the former bishop of the Roman Catholic Diocese of Sault Sainte Marie, Ontario who had died earlier in 2002.

See also
List of high schools in Ontario

References

External links
Official web site 
Profile at the Education Quality and Accountability Office (EQAO) web site

Catholic secondary schools in Ontario
High schools in Greater Sudbury
2002 establishments in Ontario
Educational institutions established in 2002